Eli Harvey (September 23, 1860 – February 10, 1957) was an American sculptor, painter and animalier.

Biography

Harvey was born in Ogden, Ohio, a Quaker community in Clinton County, to William P. and Nancy M. Harvey. He attended art school in the Art Academy of Cincinnati where he studied painting with Thomas Satterwhite Noble and sculpture with Louis Rebisso.  In 1889 he moved to Paris where he continued his studies, with Lefebvre, Constant, Doucet and finally Frémiet. In 1897 he began exhibiting sculptures of animals at Paris salons and continued doing so until returning to the United States in 1900, by which time he was "firmly committed to animal sculpture."

His work was exhibited at both the Pan-American Exposition (Buffalo, New York, 1900) and at the Louisiana Purchase Exposition (Saint Louis, Missouri, 1904) and a decade later at the Panama–Pacific International Exposition (San Francisco, California, 1915).  Harvey also produced architectural sculpture for the lion house at the New York Zoological Park and two lions for the Eaton family mausoleum in Toronto, Ontario, Canada.

Harvey's most popular work was a life-sized elk produced for the Benevolent and Protective Order of Elks and used at their buildings and in cemeteries around the United States.

He died in Alhambra, California on February 10, 1957.

His home is included on the National Register of Historic Places listings in Clinton County, Ohio.

Elk, or Elk at Rest
"The Order of Elks commissioned him to create a statue of the elk. and so pleased were they with the result that they ordered numerous replicas to be made." These include the following:

Work

Harvey's works can be found in :
 Clinton County History Center, Wilmington, Ohio
 Cranbrook Academy of Art Museum
 Los Angeles County Museum of Art
 Museum of Fine Arts, St. Petersburg, Florida
 R. W. Norton Art Gallery, Shreveport, Louisiana
 Cincinnati Art Museum, Cincinnati, Ohio
 Brookgreen Gardens, Murrells Inlet, South Carolina
 Metropolitan Museum of Art, New York City
 Eaton Mausoleum, Toronto, Canada
 Bronx Zoo, Bronx, New York
 Brown University, Providence, Rhode Island
 St. Louis Art Museum, St. Louis, Missouri
 Natural History Museum of Los Angeles County, Los Angeles
 Benevolent and Protective Order of Elks, Alexandria, Virginia
 Smithsonian American Art Museum, Washington, District of Columbia
 Chester County Historical Society, West Chester, Pennsylvania
 Westmoreland Museum of American Art, Greensburg, Pennsylvania
 Benevolent and Protective Order of Elks, Kirkwood, New York
 National Cowboy & Western Heritage Museum, Oklahoma City, Oklahoma
 Denver Art Museum, Denver, Colorado
 Buffalo Bill Historical Center, Cody, Wyoming
 Newark Museum, Newark, New Jersey
 Bridgemarket, New York City

References

1957 deaths
Animal artists
1860 births
19th-century American painters
American male painters
20th-century American painters
20th-century American sculptors
19th-century American sculptors
American male sculptors
19th-century American male artists
People from Clinton County, Ohio
20th-century American male artists